is a former Japanese football player.

Playing career
Kodai Sato played for NEC Tokin, Grulla Morioka and Vanraure Hachinohe from 2008 to 2015.

References

External links

1985 births
Living people
Fuji University alumni
Association football people from Miyagi Prefecture
Japanese footballers
J3 League players
Japan Football League players
Iwate Grulla Morioka players
Vanraure Hachinohe players
Association football forwards